Gaius Fannius (fl. 2nd century BC) was a Roman republican politician who was elected consul in 122 BC, and was one of the principal opponents of Gaius Gracchus. He was a member of the Scipionic Circle.

Career
Gaius Fannius was the son of Marcus Fannius (whose brother was probably Gaius Fannius Strabo, the consul of 161 BC),. On the assumption that this Gaius Fannius was not the historian who fought in the Third Punic War, in 146 BC he was a member of Quintus Caecilius Metellus Macedonicus’s staff in Macedonia, who sent him as part of an embassy to the Achaean League to convince them not to enter the war against Rome. After the embassy was insulted and their warnings disregarded, Fannius left and went to Athens.

Fannius next appears in 141 BC, serving with distinction as a military tribune in Hispania Ulterior under Quintus Fabius Maximus Servilianus in his war against Viriathus. It is assumed that sometime after 139 BC (possibly 137 BC), Fannius was elected as Plebeian Tribune. Then probably around 127/6 BC, he was elected to the office of Praetor, during which time he was mentioned in a decree responding to the request for Roman assistance by John Hyrcanus, the ruler of the Hasmonean Kingdom.

In 122 BC, with the support of the Tribune of the Plebs Gaius Gracchus, Fannius was elected consul, serving alongside Gnaeus Domitius Ahenobarbus. However, once he was in office, he turned against Gracchus, opposing his reforming measures and supporting the traditional senatorial group who were against any reforms which impacted upon their wealth and status. During his consulship he obeyed the Senate's directive and issued a proclamation commanding all of the Italian allies to leave Rome. He also spoke against Gracchus' proposal to extend the franchise to the Latins. Fannius' speech was regarded as an oratorical masterpiece in Cicero's time, and was widely read.

Family
Gaius Fannius married Laelia, the daughter of Gaius Laelius Sapiens. On the advice of his father-in-law, Fannius attended the lectures of the Stoic philosopher, Panaetius, at Rhodes.

Footnotes

References

Sources
 Broughton, T. Robert S., The Magistrates of the Roman Republic, Vol I (1952)
 Broughton, T. Robert S., The Magistrates of the Roman Republic, Vol III (1986)
 Cornell, T. J. The Fragments of the Roman Historians (2013)
 Smith, William, Dictionary of Greek and Roman Biography and Mythology, Vol II (1867)
 Smith, William, Dictionary of Greek and Roman Biography and Mythology, Vol III (1867)

2nd-century BC Roman augurs
2nd-century BC Roman consuls
Gaius
Year of birth unknown
Year of death unknown